Yamama  is a northern neighborhood of Marrakesh in the Marrakesh-Safi region of Morocco. It belongs to the arrondissement of Gueliz.

References

Neighborhoods of Marrakesh